The constituency of Enfield Southgate returned a memorable result in the United Kingdom 1997 general election, when the seat was unexpectedly lost by the incumbent, the Conservative's Michael Portillo, to Labour's Stephen Twigg.

The result came as a shock to many politicians and commentators, and came to symbolise the extent of the Labour landslide victory under the leadership of Tony Blair.

Background
There had been a poll in The Observer newspaper on the weekend before the election which showed that Portillo held only a three-point lead in his hitherto safe seat. Portillo had been widely expected to contest the Conservative leadership after the General Election, which without a Commons seat he was unable to do.

He had a memorable interview with Jeremy Paxman on the election night prior to the calling of his own seat. Paxman decisively opened the interview with the question "so Michael, are you going to miss the limo?" - a clear reference to the strong feeling going around on election night that he had lost his own seat. Although it was claimed that it was simply a reference to Portillo losing his role and privileges as Defence Secretary. Portillo was then stumped with the follow up question of "are we seeing the end of the Conservative Party as a credible force in British politics?". He has since admitted that he knew he had lost his seat by the time of the interview:

Declaration
The election result was announced live on national television. Enfield Mayor Patrick Cunneen was the returning officer. The candidates lined up on the stage at the Picketts Lock Leisure Centre in Enfield, while Cunneen read out the results, starting with these candidates:
 Jeremy Browne (Liberal Democrats) – 4,966 (10.7%)
 Nicholas Luard (Referendum Party) – 1,342 (2.9%)
 Andrew Malakouna (Mal – Voice of the People) – 229 (0.5%).
There was a brief ripple of laughter when Cunneen read out Portillo's given names – Michael Denzil Xavier – and then quiet as he announced Portillo's vote – 19,137 (41.1%) – followed by some applause. After announcing the results for Alan Storkey of the Christian Democrat Party – 289 (0.6%) – and waiting for brief cheers from Storkey's supporters to subside, Cunneen announced Twigg's name and then his vote – 20,570 votes (44.2%) – triggering sustained loud celebrations from Labour supporters.

Portillo's defeat represented a 17.4% swing to Labour. Although Twigg retained the seat with an increased majority in 2001, it returned to the Conservative Party in 2005 with a swing of 8.7%.

'Portillo moment'

The 1997 loss, symbolising the loss of the election by the Conservative Party, has been referred to as "the Portillo moment", and in the cliché "Were you up for Portillo?" (i.e., "Were you awake/did you see Portillo's result announced on television?") Portillo himself commented, thirteen years later, that as a consequence "My name is now synonymous with eating a bucketload of shit in public."

Result

References

External links
 Video of Conservative Michael Portillo losing his seat to Labour's Stephen Twigg

Elections in the London Borough of Enfield
1997 in London
United Kingdom general election results in London
1997 United Kingdom general election
Constituency contests in UK General Elections